David Russell may refer to:

Sports people
 Dave Russell (footballer) (1914–2000), Scottish footballer
 David A. Russell (golfer) (born 1957), English professional golfer
 David J. Russell (born 1954), English professional golfer
 David Russell (cricketer, born 1936), English cricketer
 David Russell (Scottish footballer) (1862–1918), Scottish footballer
 David Russell (racing driver) (born 1982), Australian racing driver
 David Russell (Gaelic footballer), Gaelic footballer from County Clare
 David Russell (basketball), American basketball player who played in the Spanish basketball league Liga ACB
 Davie Russell (1871–1952), Scottish footballer
 Davy Russell (born 1979), Irish jockey

Military
 David Russell (British Army officer) (1809–1884), British general
 David Russell (GC) (1911–1945), lance corporal with the 22nd Battalion, New Zealand Infantry, 2nd NZEF
 David Allen Russell (1820–1864), United States Army officer
 David Russell (Royal Navy officer) (born 1952), first captain of HMS Vanguard
 David F. O. Russell (1915–1993), British businessman and philanthropist.

Politicians
 David Abel Russell (1780–1861), U.S. Representative from New York
 David John Russell (born 1931), politician from Alberta, Canada
 David Russell, 5th Baron Ampthill (born 1947), British publisher and politician, heir to Baron Ampthill

Others
 Sir David Russell (1872–1956) Scottish businessman and philanthropist
 David Russell (bishop) (1938–2014), Anglican bishop
 David Russell (barrister) (born 1950), Australian barrister
 David Russell (guitarist) (born 1953), classical guitarist
 David Lynn Russell (born 1942), U.S. federal judge
 David O. Russell (born 1958), American film director and screenwriter
 David R. Russell (1935–2018), collector of antique woodworking tools
 David Syme Russell (1916–2010), British theologian and author